Lana T. Hurdle is an American public official who served as the acting United States Secretary of Transportation in the Biden administration. Hurdle served in an interim capacity until Biden's nominee, Pete Buttigieg, was confirmed by the United States Senate. Hurdle serves as the deputy assistant secretary for budget and programs in the Department of Transportation.

Education 
Hurdle earned a Bachelor of Arts degree in government and foreign affairs from the University of Virginia in 1977.

Career 
Prior to her assignments at the Department of Transportation, Hurdle served as the CFO for the Peace Corps. She was the senior financial management official overseeing all financial management services spanning 77 countries world-wide.

Hurdle began her Federal government career at the Office of Management and Budget as budget examiner for the United States Coast Guard, Federal Trade Commission, and National Transportation Safety Board.

Department of Transportation 

Hurdle is the Deputy Assistant Secretary for Budget and Programs at the United States Department of Transportation. She is the principal career deputy and the senior member, CFO, and assistant secretary for the budget and programs team. Hurdle directs the overall budget and program performance process for the Department and supports the leadership team on a wide variety of projects. Hurdle has served as the department’s liaison to the presidential transition of Joe Biden, providing advice and assistance to the senior career staff in preparing for a change in administrations.

Hurdle received the Meritorious (2006) and Distinguished Executive (2011) Senior Executive Service Presidential Rank Awards for her contributions in budget and financial management throughout her Federal service.

Personal life 
Hurdle lives in Arlington, Virginia with her husband Robert.

References

External links
 https://www.transportation.gov/budget/about-cfo

Biden administration personnel
Biden administration cabinet members
United States Department of Transportation officials
United States Secretaries of Transportation
Living people
Year of birth missing (living people)